Bhakkar is a city in Punjab, Pakistan.

Bhakkar may also refer to:

 Bhakkar District, a district of Punjab (Pakistan)
 Bhakkar Tehsil, a tehsil of district Bhakkar
 Bhakkar railway station, a railway station in Pakistan.

See also
 Bakkar, an Egyptian cartoon series
 Bakhar (disambiguation)
 Barkhan (disambiguation)